The 1996–97 Boston University Terriers men's basketball team represented Boston University during the 1996–97 NCAA Division I men's basketball season. The Terriers, led by third year head coach Dennis Wolff, played their home games at Case Gym and were members of the America East Conference. They finished the season 25–5, 17–1 in America East play to win the regular season conference title. The Terriers won the America East tournament to receive an automatic bid to the NCAA tournament as No. 12 seed in the Midwest region. Boston University was defeated by top seed Tulsa in the opening round, 81–52.

Senior forward Tunji Awojobi was selected America East Player of the Year and finished his career as BU's all-time leader in scoring, rebounding, and blocks.

Roster

Schedule and results

|-
!colspan=9 style=| Regular season

|-
!colspan=9 style=| America East tournament

|-
!colspan=9 style=| NCAA tournament

Awards and honors
Tunji Awojobi – America East Player of the Year

References

Boston University Terriers men's basketball seasons
Boston University
Boston University
Boston University Terriers men's basketball team
Boston University Terriers men's basketball team